M12 was a Ukrainian international highway (M-highway) connecting Lviv Oblast to Central Ukraine, where after crossing the Dnieper it continued further as the M04. On 28 April 2021, the M12 was decommissioned and merged with the M04 to form the new M30.

General overview
The M12 is a major transnational corridor and along with the M04 combines into E50. The highway is also part of the Gdańsk - Odessa Transportation corridor on the segment from Ternopil to Uman.

Description
For the entire route from Stryi to Znamianka the M12 is part of the E50, however in Kropyvnytskyi it is also joined by the E584 that travels from Moldova to Poltava.

Main Route

Main route and connections to/intersections with other highways in Ukraine.

Access routes
The highway passes the following cities going around them, however it has spurred away access routes towards them.
 Vinnytsia 
 Khmelnytskyi

Gallery

See also

 Roads in Ukraine
 Ukraine Highways
 International E-road network
 Pan-European corridors

References

External links
 International Roads in Ukraine in Russian
 European Roads in Russian

Vinnytsia
Ternopil
Uman
Kropyvnytskyi
Stryi
Khmelnytskyi, Ukraine
European route E50
Rohatyn
Roads in Lviv Oblast
Roads in Ternopil Oblast
Roads in Khmelnytskyi Oblast
Roads in Vinnytsia Oblast
Roads in Cherkasy Oblast
Roads in Kirovohrad Oblast